Ramadan Yusef Mohammed (born 12 February 2001) is an Ethiopian professional footballer who plays as a left-back for Ethiopian Premier League club Saint George and the Ethiopia national team.

Club career

Yusef began his career with Shire Endaselassie and made his debut in the 2018-19 Ethiopian Premier League season.

On 1 October 2020, Yusef signed with Wolkite City.

On 11 July 2022, Yusef signed with Saint George.

International career
Yusef made his international debut with the Ethiopia national team in a 0–0 2022 FIFA World Cup qualification tie with Lesotho on 4 September 2019.

On 23 December 2021, Yusef was included in the Ethiopian squad for the 2021 Africa Cup of Nations.

References

External links
 

2001 births
Living people
Sportspeople from Benishangul-Gumuz Region
Ethiopian footballers
Ethiopia international footballers
Ethiopian Premier League players
Association football fullbacks
Wolkite City F.C. players
2021 Africa Cup of Nations players
2022 African Nations Championship players
Ethiopia A' international footballers